WCLT (1430 AM) is a radio station broadcasting an adult contemporary format. Licensed to Newark, Ohio, United States.  The station is currently owned by WCLT Radio and features programming from  Westwood One.

FM Translator
In addition to the main station at 1430 kHz, WCLT is relayed by an FM translator to widen the broadcast area, especially during nighttime hours when the AM frequency broadcasts with only 48 watts.

History
On January 11, 2017, at 12:00 p.m., WCLT changed their format from sports to adult contemporary, branded as "Kate 98.7".

Previous logo

References

External links

CLT